César Palacios Chocarro (born 19 October 1974) is a Spanish former footballer who played mainly as a central midfielder.

His career was solely associated with two clubs, Osasuna and Numancia, having captained the former a number of years. Both major levels of Spanish football combined he appeared in 520 official matches as a professional, amassing La Liga totals of 130 games and four goals over seven seasons.

Club career
A product of hometown CA Osasuna's youth system, Palacios – born in Pamplona, Navarre – made his first-team debut on 6 April 1994 in a 1–0 home win to CD Tenerife, with the team eventually finishing the season in the last position. He went on to become an important element of the squad in the following years, which included six Segunda División seasons; in 1999–2000, as the team returned to La Liga after a six-year absence, he scored five goals in 40 games, and also served as one of their captains.

For the 2004–05 campaign, Palacios joined Soria's CD Numancia, where he was an undisputed first-choice from the start, helping the side return to the top level in 2008. In late June 2010, after a combined 52 league appearances in two seasons, 19 in the top tier in 2008–09, the 35-year-old retired from the game, becoming his last club's director of football.

International career
Palacios represented Spain at various youth levels, but was never capped by the senior team. In 1991, he helped the under-17s win the UEFA European Championship in Switzerland (then named under-16).

Three months later, Palacios played six matches in the category's FIFA U-17 World Cup, as the country finished in second position in Italy.

Honours

Club
Numancia
Segunda División: 2007–08

International
Spain U16
UEFA European Under-16 Championship: 1991

Spain U17
FIFA U-17 World Cup: Runner-up 1991

References

External links

1974 births
Living people
Footballers from Pamplona
Spanish footballers
Association football midfielders
La Liga players
Segunda División players
Segunda División B players
CA Osasuna B players
CA Osasuna players
CD Numancia players
Spain youth international footballers